Zhihe may refer to:

Places in China
Zhihe, Shanxi (芝河), a town in Yonghe County, Shanxi
Zhihe Subdistrict, Jilin (致和街道), Jilin
Zhihe Subdistrict, Pengzhou (致和街道), Sichuan

Historical eras
Zhihe (至和, 1054–1056), era name used by Emperor Renzong of Song
Zhihe (致和, 1328), era name used by Yesün Temür (Yuan dynasty)